Grillotius is a genus of moths of the family Sphingidae, containing only one species, Grillotius bergeri, which is known from Gabon, the Republic of the Congo and the Democratic Republic of the Congo.

References

Smerinthini
Monotypic moth genera
Insects of the Democratic Republic of the Congo
Fauna of the Republic of the Congo
Fauna of Gabon
Moths of Africa